Carles Solà was born in Xàtiva, Valencia Province on 1 January 1945.

He awarded a PhD degree in Chemistry at the UV, he has carried out research in Biochemical Engineering with 130 publications, having tutored 22 doctoral theses and directed various research projects. He was Rector of the UAB (1994-2002). He was a lecturer in Chemical Engineering at the UAB.

President of the Conference of Rectors of Spanish Universities (1996–98). Member of the Executive Committee for the International Association of University Presidents (2000-2002). Member of the Board of the European University Association (2001–05). Member of the Executive Committee of the Spanish Society of Biotechnology (2002–06). Doctor Honoris Causa in Science from the University of Southampton (1999). Member of the American Institute of Chemical Engineers. Member of ACPV. Member of the IEC.

References

1945 births
Living people
People from Xàtiva
Spanish biochemists
University of Valencia alumni
Members of the Institute for Catalan Studies